William Brooke Joyce (24 April 1906 – 3 January 1946), nicknamed Lord Haw-Haw, was an American-born fascist and Nazi propaganda broadcaster during the Second World War. After moving from New York to Ireland and subsequently to England, Joyce became a member of Oswald Mosley's British Union of Fascists (BUF) from 1932, before finally moving to Germany at the outset of the war where he took German citizenship in 1940.

At the end of the war, after capture, Joyce was convicted in the United Kingdom of high treason in 1945 and sentenced to death, with the Court of Appeal and the House of Lords both upholding his conviction. He was hanged in Wandsworth Prison by Albert Pierrepoint on 3 January 1946, making him the last person to be executed for treason in the United Kingdom.

Early life
William Brooke Joyce was born on Herkimer Street in Brooklyn, New York, United States. His father was Michael Francis Joyce, an Irish Catholic from a family of tenant farmers in Ballinrobe, County Mayo, who had acquired U.S. citizenship in 1894. His mother was Gertrude Emily Brooke, who although born in Shaw and Crompton, Lancashire, was from a well-off Anglican Anglo-Irish family of physicians associated with County Roscommon.

A few years after William's birth, the family returned to Salthill, Galway. Joyce attended Coláiste Iognáid, a Jesuit school in Galway, from 1915 to 1921. His parents were unionist and hostile to Irish nationalism, and his mother was a devout Protestant. There were tensions between her and her family because she married a Catholic. Joyce's father purchased several houses, and rented some to members of the Royal Irish Constabulary (RIC).

Although Joyce was still only in his mid-teens, he was recruited by the British Army during the Irish War for Independence by Captain Patrick William Keating as a courier for Intelligence Corps personnel stationed in Galway. Joyce was also known to associate with Black and Tans (reserve RIC constables) stationed at Lenaboy Castle, and was accused of being an informer and linked to the 1920 murder of Catholic priest and known Irish republican sympathizer Michael Griffin by the Auxiliary Division. Keating arranged for Joyce to be mustered into the Worcestershire Regiment, taking him out of the dangerous situation in Ireland to Norton Barracks in England. He was discharged a few months later, when it was discovered that he was underage.

Joyce remained in England and briefly attended King's College School, Wimbledon. His family followed him to England two years later. Joyce had relatives in Birkenhead, Merseyside, whom he visited on a few occasions. He then applied to Birkbeck College, London, where he entered the Officer Training Corps. At Birkbeck, he obtained a first-class honours degree in English. After graduating he applied for a job in the Foreign Office, but was rejected and took a job as a teacher. Joyce developed an interest in fascism and worked with, but never joined, the British Fascists of Rotha Lintorn-Orman.

On 22 October 1924, while stewarding a meeting in support of Conservative Party candidate Jack Lazarus ahead of the 1924 general election, Joyce was attacked by communists and received a deep razor slash across his right cheek. It left a permanent scar which ran from the earlobe to the corner of the mouth. While Joyce often said that his attackers were Jewish, historian Colin Holmes claims that Joyce's first wife told him that "it wasn't a Jewish Communist who disfigured him .... He was knifed by an Irish woman".

British Union of Fascists

In 1932 Joyce joined the British Union of Fascists (BUF) under Sir Oswald Mosley and swiftly became a leading speaker, praised for the power of his oratory. The journalist and novelist Cecil Roberts described a speech given by Joyce:

In 1934 Joyce was promoted to be the BUF's Director of Propaganda, replacing Wilfred Risdon, and later appointed deputy leader. As well as being a gifted speaker, Joyce gained the reputation of a savage brawler. His violent rhetoric and willingness to physically confront anti-fascist elements head-on played no small part in further politically marginalising the BUF. After a bloody incident at a BUF rally in Olympia in 1934, Joyce spearheaded the group's policy shift from campaigning for economic revival through corporatism to a focus on antisemitism. He was instrumental in changing the name of the BUF to "British Union of Fascists and National Socialists" in 1936 and stood as a party candidate in the 1937 elections to the London County Council. In 1936, Joyce lived for a year in Whitstable, where he owned a radio and electrical shop.

Between April 1934 and 1937, when Mosley sacked him, Joyce served as Area Administrative Officer for the BUF West Sussex division. He was supported in the role by Norah Elam as Sussex Women's Organiser, with her partner Dudley Elam, the son of an Irish nationalist, taking on the role of Sub-Branch Officer for Worthing. Under this regime, West Sussex became a hub of fascist activity, ranging from hosting BUF summer camps to organising meetings and rallies, lunches, etc. Elam shared many speaking platforms with Joyce and worked on propaganda speeches for him. One particular sore point for Joyce was the Government of India Bill, passed in 1935, designed to give a measure of autonomy to India, allowing freedom and the development of limited self-government. Joyce harboured a desire to become Viceroy of India should Mosley ever head a BUF government, and is recorded as describing the backers of the bill as "feeble" and "one loathsome, foetid, purulent, tumid mass of hypocrisy, hiding behind Jewish Dictators".

Joyce was sacked from his paid position when Mosley drastically reduced the BUF staff shortly after the 1937 elections, after which Joyce promptly formed a breakaway organisation, the National Socialist League. After Joyce's departure, the BUF turned its focus from antisemitism to activism, opposing a war with Nazi Germany. Although Joyce had been deputy leader of the party from 1933 and an effective fighter and orator, Mosley snubbed him in his autobiography and later denounced him as a traitor because of his wartime activities. Unlike Joyce, the Elams did not escape detention under Defence Regulation 18B; both were arrested on the same day as Mosley in May 1940. In later life, Elam reported that, although she disliked Joyce, she believed that his execution by the British in 1946 was wrong, stating that he should not have been regarded as a traitor to England because he was not English, but Irish.

In Germany

In late August 1939, shortly before the Second World War broke out, Joyce and his wife Margaret fled to Germany. Joyce had been tipped off that the British authorities intended to detain him under Defence Regulation 18B. He became a naturalised German citizen in 1940.

In Berlin, Joyce could not find employment until a chance meeting with fellow Mosleyite Dorothy Eckersley got him an audition at the Rundfunkhaus ("broadcasting house"). Eckersley was the former wife or second wife of the chief engineer of the BBC, Peter Eckersley. Despite having a heavy cold and having almost lost his voice, Joyce was recruited immediately for radio announcements and scriptwriting at German radio's English service. His first broadcast was reading the news in English on 6 September 1939, just three days after the declaration of war between Britain and Germany. On 18 September he received a contract as a newsreader. After the dismissal of Norman Baillie-Stewart in December, Joyce became the principal reader of news and the writer of six talks a week, thus becoming the station's best-known propaganda broadcaster.

In a newspaper article of 14 September 1939, the radio critic Jonah Barrington of the Daily Express wrote of hearing a gent "moaning periodically from Zeesen" who "speaks English of the haw-haw, damit-get-out-of-my-way variety". Four days later he gave him the nickname 'Lord Haw-Haw'. The voice Barrington heard is widely believed to be that of Wolf Mittler, a German journalist whose near-flawless English sounded like a caricature of an upper-crust Englishman. However, Mittler only made five or six broadcasts and was quickly replaced by other broadcasters, leading to uncertainty over to whom Barrington had been referring. When Joyce became the most prominent broadcaster of Nazi propaganda by the end of 1939, the name stuck to him. Joyce himself began to trade on the notoriety of the nickname more than a year later, on 3 April 1941, when he announced himself as "William Joyce, otherwise known as Lord Haw-Haw".

Joyce's broadcasts initially came from studios in Berlin, later being transferred (because of heavy Allied bombing) to Luxembourg City and finally to Apen near Hamburg, and were relayed over a network of German-controlled radio stations in Zeesen, Hamburg, Bremen, Luxembourg, Hilversum, Calais and Oslo.

Joyce also broadcast on and wrote scripts for the German Büro Concordia organisation, which ran several black propaganda stations, many of which pretended to broadcast illegally from within Britain. His role in writing the scripts increased over time, and German radio capitalised on his public persona. Initially an anonymous broadcaster, Joyce eventually revealed his real name to his listeners and he would occasionally be announced as, "William Joyce, otherwise known as Lord Haw-Haw". Urban legends soon circulated about Lord Haw-Haw, alleging that the broadcaster was well-informed about political and military events to the point of near-omniscience. In the summer of 1942 it was decided that he should no longer read the news and, from then on, he read only his own talks in Views on the News.

Listening to Joyce's broadcasts was officially discouraged but was not illegal, and many Britons tuned in. There was a desire by civilian listeners to hear what the other side was saying, as information during wartime was strictly censored. At the height of his influence, in 1940, Joyce had an estimated six million regular and 18 million occasional listeners in the UK. The broadcasts always began with the announcer's words, "Germany calling, Germany calling, Germany calling". These broadcasts urged the British people to surrender and were well known for their jeering, sarcastic and menacing tone.

The Reich Security Main Office commissioned Joyce to give lectures at the University of Berlin for SS members in the winter of 1941–42 on the topic of "British fascism and acute questions concerning the British world empire".

Joyce recorded his final broadcast on 30 April 1945, during the Battle of Berlin. Rambling and audibly drunk, he chided the UK for pursuing the war beyond mere containment of Germany and repeatedly warned of the "menace" of the Soviet Union. He signed off with a final defiant, "Heil Hitler and farewell". There are conflicting accounts as to whether this last programme was actually transmitted, although a recording was found in the Apen studios. The next day, Radio Hamburg was seized by British forces, and on 4 May Wynford Vaughan-Thomas used it to make a mock "Germany Calling" broadcast denouncing Joyce.

Besides broadcasting, Joyce's duties included writing propaganda for distribution among British prisoners of war, whom he tried to recruit into the British Free Corps of the Waffen-SS. He wrote a book Twilight Over England promoted by the German Ministry of Propaganda, which unfavourably compared the evils of allegedly Jewish-dominated capitalist Britain with the alleged wonders of Nazi Germany. Adolf Hitler awarded Joyce the War Merit Cross (First and Second Class) for his broadcasts, although he never met Joyce.

Capture and trial

On 28 May 1945, Joyce was captured by British forces at Flensburg, near the German border with Denmark, which was the last capital of the Third Reich. Spotting a dishevelled figure while they were resting from gathering firewood, intelligence soldiers – including a Jewish German, Geoffrey Perry (born Horst Pinschewer), who had left Germany before the war – engaged him in conversation in French and English, eventually recognising his voice. After they asked whether he was Joyce, he reached into his pocket (actually reaching for a false passport); believing he was armed, Perry shot him through the buttocks, resulting in four wounds.

Two intelligence officers then drove Joyce to a border post and handed him over to British military police. He was then taken to London and tried at the Old Bailey on three counts of high treason:

"Not guilty" were the first words from Joyce's mouth in his trial, as noted by Rebecca West in her book The Meaning of Treason. The only evidence offered that he had begun broadcasting from Germany while his British passport was valid was the testimony of a London police inspector who had questioned him before the war while he was an active member of the British Union of Fascists and claimed to have recognised his voice on a propaganda broadcast in the early weeks of the war – Joyce had previous convictions for assault and riotous assembly in the 1930s.

Inquiries in the US, adduced in evidence at his trial, found that Joyce had never been a British subject, and it seemed that he would have to be acquitted based upon a lack of jurisdiction; he could not be convicted of betraying a country that was not his own. The trial judge, Mr. Justice Tucker, directed the jury to acquit Joyce of the first and second charges. However, the Attorney General, Sir Hartley Shawcross, successfully argued that Joyce's possession of a British passport, even though he had misstated his nationality to get it, entitled him until it expired to British diplomatic protection in Germany and therefore he owed allegiance to the King at the time he began working for the Germans.

The historian A. J. P. Taylor remarked in his book English History 1914–1945 that "Technically, Joyce was hanged for making a false statement when applying for a passport, the usual penalty for which is a small fine."

Appeal
Joyce's conviction was upheld by the Court of Appeal on 1 November 1945, and by Lords Jowitt L.C., Macmillan, Wright, Simonds, and Porter – although Porter dissented – of the House of Lords on 13 December 1945.

In the appeal, Joyce argued that possession of a passport did not entitle him to the protection of the Crown, and therefore did not perpetuate his duty of allegiance once he left the country, but the House of Lords rejected this argument. Lord Porter's dissenting opinion assumed that the question as to whether Joyce's duty of allegiance had terminated was a question of fact for the jury to decide, rather than a purely legal question for the judge. Joyce also argued that jurisdiction had been wrongly assumed by the court in electing to try an alien for offences committed in a foreign country. This argument was also rejected, on the basis that a state may exercise such jurisdiction in the interests of its own security.

Joyce's biographer, Nigel Farndale, suggests on the basis of documents made public for the first time between 2000 and 2005 that Joyce made a deal with his prosecutors not to reveal links he had had to MI5. In return, his wife Margaret, known to radio listeners as "Lady Haw-Haw", was spared prosecution for high treason. Of the 33 British renegades and broadcasters caught in Germany at the end of the war, only Margaret Joyce, who died in London in 1972, was not charged with treason.

Execution
Joyce went to his death unrepentant. He allegedly said:

"You have conquered nevertheless" was presumably a reference to ", a phrase inscribed on the reverse side of the Blood Order medal. Other sources refer to his having said, "May the swastika be raised from the dust".

Joyce was executed on 3 January 1946 at Wandsworth Prison, aged 39. He was the penultimate person hanged for a crime other than murder in the UK. The last was Theodore Schurch, executed for treachery the following day at Pentonville Prison. In both cases, the hangman was Albert Pierrepoint. Joyce died "an Anglican, like his mother, despite a long and friendly correspondence with a Roman Catholic priest who fought hard for William's soul". The scar on Joyce's face split wide open because of the pressure applied to his head upon his drop from the gallows.

Burial 
As was customary for executed criminals, Joyce's remains were buried in an unmarked grave within the walls of Wandsworth Prison. In 1976, following a campaign by his daughter, Heather Iandolo, his body was reinterred in New Cemetery, Galway, as he had lived in Galway with his family from 1909 until 1922. Despite the ambiguity of his religious allegiances, he was given a Roman Catholic Tridentine Mass.

Family
Joyce had two daughters with his first wife, Hazel, who later married Oswald Mosley's bodyguard, Eric Piercey. One daughter, Heather Iandolo (formerly Piercey), spoke publicly of her father. She died in 2022.

See also

Footnotes

References

Bibliography

Further reading
The Trial of William Joyce ed. by C.E. Bechhofer Roberts [Old Bailey Trials series] (Jarrolds, London, 1946)
The Trial of William Joyce ed. by J.W. Hall [Notable British Trials series] (William Hodge and Company, London, 1946)
The Meaning of Treason by Dame Rebecca West (Macmillan, London, 1949)
Lord Haw-Haw and William Joyce by William Cole (Faber and Faber, London, 1964)
Hitler's Englishman by Francis Selwyn (Routledge and Kegan Paul Ltd, London, 1987)
Renegades: Hitler's Englishmen by Adrian Weale (Weidenfeld & Nicolson, London, 1994)
Germany Calling: A Personal Biography of William Joyce, Lord Haw-Haw by Mary Kenny (New Island Books, Dublin, 2003) 
Haw-Haw: The Tragedy of William and Margaret Joyce by Nigel Farndale (Macmillan, London, 2005)
Searching for Lord Haw-Haw: The Political Lives of William Joyce by Colin Holmes (Routledge, Abingdon, 2016)
Security Service files on him are held by the National Archives under references KV 2/245 to KV 2/250

External links

Fascism and Jewry (first published 1933, this version published 1935), reproduction of a pamphlet by William Joyce for the BUF.
Twilight Over England by William Joyce. A summation of his worldview (Internet Archive).
"Twilight over England" 2008 reprint by AAARGH.
The final broadcast of William Joyce during the Battle of Berlin 1945. Possibly due to effects of alcohol, Joyce's speech is quite slurred.
William Joyce page at Earthstation One—includes audio clips
William Joyce, alias Lord Haw-Haw by Alex Softly.
Transcript of the House of Lords decision in the Appeal of William Joyce, published four weeks after his execution.
Joyce v. DPP (transcript of judgement) (HTML)
Germany Calling! Germany Calling! The Influence of Lord Haw-Haw (William Joyce) in Britain, 1939–1941 A thesis, in downloadable form, by Monash University student Helen Newman.
the voice of treason
Internet Archive collection of "Germany Calling" broadcasts
BBC Archive – Lord Haw-Haw 
Final "Germany Calling" broadcast by the BBC after the station was taken over by the British

1906 births
1946 deaths
Alumni of Birkbeck, University of London
Anti-Masonry
Antisemitism in the United Kingdom
Executed American collaborators with Nazi Germany
American expatriates in Germany
American expatriates in the United Kingdom
American anti-communists
American fascists
American people convicted of assault
American people executed abroad
American people of Irish descent
People executed for treason against the United Kingdom
Executed German people
Executed people from New York (state)
British far-right politicians
British anti-communists
British fascists
Child soldiers
German anti-communists
German people of World War II
Naturalized citizens of Germany
Nazi propagandists
People from Bedford–Stuyvesant, Brooklyn
People executed by the United Kingdom by hanging
20th-century executions by England and Wales
20th-century executions of American people
Worcestershire Regiment soldiers
British propagandists
Executed British collaborators with Nazi Germany
British military personnel of the Irish War of Independence
Officers' Training Corps officers